Calyciphora marashella is a moth of the family Pterophoridae.

References

Moths described in 1986
Pterophorini